George Harry Rhodes (born 26 October 1993) is an English cricketer. He made his List A debut on 7 June 2016 for Worcestershire against Yorkshire in the Royal London One-Day Cup. He made his first-class debut on 10 July 2016 for Worcestershire against Northamptonshire in the 2016 County Championship. He is the son of former England cricketer, Steve Rhodes, and grandson of Billy Rhodes, who played for Nottinghamshire, both of whom were wicket-keepers.

References

External links
 

1993 births
Living people
English cricketers
Worcestershire cricketers
Leicestershire cricketers
Place of birth missing (living people)